Harvey is an unincorporated community in Fayette County, West Virginia, United States.

History
Harvey had a post office, which closed on February 13, 1988. The community has the name of one Mr. Harvey, a local farmer.

References

Unincorporated communities in Fayette County, West Virginia
Unincorporated communities in West Virginia
Coal towns in West Virginia